Group B of UEFA Euro 2000 began on 10 June and ended on 19 June 2000. Italy won the group ahead of Turkey. Belgium and Sweden were eliminated.

Teams

Notes

Standings

In the quarter-finals,
The winner of Group B, Italy, advanced to play the runner-up of Group A, Romania.
The runner-up of Group B, Turkey, advanced to play the winner of Group A, Portugal.

Matches

Belgium vs Sweden

Turkey vs Italy

Italy vs Belgium

Sweden vs Turkey

Turkey vs Belgium

Italy vs Sweden

Notes

References

External links
UEFA Euro 2000 Group B

Group B
group
Turkey at UEFA Euro 2000
Belgium at UEFA Euro 2000
Sweden at UEFA Euro 2000